Vjekoslav Lokica (born 19 September 1965) is a Croatian professional football manager and  former player.

Managerial career
He replaced Goran Sablić as manager of RNK Split in July 2016.

Personal life
He was married to Žana Lelas, a former basketball player.

References

1965 births
Living people
Sportspeople from Split, Croatia
Croatian football managers
NK Solin managers
HNK Šibenik managers
NK Osijek managers
HNK Rijeka managers
NK Marsonia managers
HŠK Posušje managers
NK Hrvatski Dragovoljac managers
NK Primorje managers
NK Zagreb managers
FC Brașov (1936) managers
RNK Split managers
Meizhou Hakka F.C. managers
Croatian expatriate football managers
Expatriate football managers in Bosnia and Herzegovina
Croatian expatriate sportspeople in Bosnia and Herzegovina
Expatriate football managers in Slovenia
Croatian expatriate sportspeople in Slovenia
Expatriate football managers in Romania
Croatian expatriate sportspeople in Romania
Expatriate football managers in China
Croatian expatriate sportspeople in China